Lasionycta discolor is a moth of the family Noctuidae. It occurs in the Rocky Mountains of Colorado and on the Beartooth Plateau in Wyoming.

It flies over alpine tundra and is both diurnal and nocturnal.

Adults are on wing in late July.

External links
A Revision of Lasionycta Aurivillius (Lepidoptera, Noctuidae) for North America and notes on Eurasian species, with descriptions of 17 new species, 6 new subspecies, a new genus, and two new species of Tricholita Grote

Lasionycta
Moths of North America
Moths described in 1899